Lukas Bornhøft Jensen (born 18 March 1999) is a Danish professional footballer who plays as a goalkeeper for Accrington Stanley, on loan from Burnley.

Early life
Between the ages of 14 and 17 Jensen quit football and instead spent three years riding mountain bikes, taking part in the European Mountain Bike Championships and Scandinavian Mountain Bike Championships.

Career
In September 2019 he signed for Burnley following a successful trial. A broken elbow and international clearance delayed his Clarets debut for the under-23 side. He was rewarded with a new contract in January 2020 until the summer of 2021 with the option of a further year, after a string of impressive performances for the under-23 side. He made the bench for the first team on three occasions in June 2020 following the COVID-19 lockdown restart, after it was announced Joe Hart would be leaving the club on a free transfer.

On 1 February 2021, Jensen joined League Two side Bolton Wanderers on loan for the remainder of the 2020–21 season. He played no matches, spending the entire time as second choice behind Matt Gilks. Though he played no matches, he still considered the loan a success as he was able to experience being part of a promotion winning team.

On 14 May 2021, he joined Kórdrengir on loan for two months. He played seven times during this loan spell.

Jensen joined Carlisle United on season-long loan on 20 July 2021. He spent another loan as a back up goalkeeper, playing only four matches total.

Jensen joined Accrington Stanley on season-long loan on 28 June 2022.

Career statistics

References

1999 births
Living people
People from Helsingør
Danish men's footballers
Danish expatriate men's footballers
Association football goalkeepers
Danish Superliga players
1. deild karla players
FC Helsingør players
Hellerup IK players
Burnley F.C. players
Bolton Wanderers F.C. players
Kórdrengir players
Carlisle United F.C. players
Accrington Stanley F.C. players
Danish expatriate sportspeople in England
Expatriate footballers in England
Cross-country mountain bikers
Sportspeople from the Capital Region of Denmark